Stomina is a genus of parasitic flies in the family Tachinidae.

Species
Stomina angustifrons Kugler, 1968
Stomina caliendrata (Rondani, 1862)
Stomina calvescens Herting, 1977
Stomina iners (Meigen, 1838)
Stomina kugleri Mesnil, 1975
Stomina tachinoides (Fallén, 1817)

References

Diptera of Asia
Diptera of Africa
Diptera of Europe
Dexiinae
Tachinidae genera
Taxa named by Jean-Baptiste Robineau-Desvoidy